Chimnechild of Burgundy (7th-century – fl. 662) was a Frankish queen consort by marriage to king Sigebert III.

She was the mother of Bilichild and possibly of Dagobert II. When Childebert the Adopted died, she opposed the succession of Theuderic III and arranged a marriage between her daughter and Childeric II, whose succession she supported.

References 

7th-century births
7th-century deaths
7th-century Frankish women
Frankish queens consort
Merovingian dynasty